Mike Gillian is an American basketball coach, and formerly served as the head men's basketball coach at Longwood University from 2003 to 2013. Resigning from Longwood on March 14, 2013, he had guided the team in their transition to NCAA Division I play, and into their first season as members of the Big South Conference. Prior to his time at Longwood, he was an assistant coach for seven years under Jim Larrañaga at Bowling Green and George Mason.

On November 7, 2013, Gillian was announced as an assistant coach at Florida International University. Gillian was not retained after FIU hired Jeremy Ballard as head coach in April 2018. As of the 2018–19 season, he is providing color commentary for broadcasts on ESPN platforms.

Head coaching record

References

1964 births
American men's basketball coaches
Basketball players from Massachusetts
Bowling Green Falcons men's basketball coaches
George Mason Patriots men's basketball coaches
Living people
Longwood Lancers men's basketball coaches
People from Ayer, Massachusetts
American men's basketball players
Basketball coaches from Massachusetts
Sportspeople from Middlesex County, Massachusetts